The A5127 is a major road in England which runs between Birmingham and Lichfield, Staffordshire. For much of the route the road follows the old route of the A38 which has since been moved in order to by-pass places such as Erdington and Sutton Coldfield and form a relief road from Birmingham city centre to Spaghetti Junction.

The part from the county boundary, through Shenstone to Lichfield was one of the roads of the Lichfield Turnpike Trust, established in 1729. Beyond Lichfield, it joins the Roman Ryknild Street at Streethay and immediately after that joins the present A38.

Route

Main places and junctions along the A5127:

 Birmingham
 Aston, Birmingham
 A38(M) Aston Expressway Junction
 M6 motorway Junction 6 (Gravelly Hill Interchange / Spaghetti Junction)
 Gravelly Hill, Birmingham
 Erdington, Birmingham
 A452 Chester Road junction
 Wylde Green, Birmingham
 Sutton Coldfield, Birmingham
 Passes near Sutton Park
 A453 Tamworth Road junction
 A454 junction
 Four Oaks, Birmingham
 Birmingham & West Midlands/ Staffordshire boundary
 Shenstone, Staffordshire
 Wall junction with M6 Toll, A5 and A5148 (leading to A38)
 A461/ A51 Junction
 Lichfield, Staffordshire
 A38 Junction
This route closely follows the Cross-City Line.

References

Roads in England
Transport in Birmingham, West Midlands
Sutton Coldfield
Transport in Staffordshire
Roads in the West Midlands (county)